Wake-Walker may refer to:

 Baldwin Wake Walker  (1802–1876), surveyor of the Royal Navy
 Frederic Wake-Walker (1888–1945), British Royal Navy Admiral

See also
 Wake-Walker v SS Colin W Ltd, Canadian Admiralty law case

Compound surnames